Allen Andrews (born February 5, 1967) is an American Republican politician and business owner. Before entering politics Andrews operated the Wool shop  a company specializing in wool cleaning products. Andrews represented thr 1st district in the Missouri House of Representatives from 2015 to 2023, and served as Majority Whip from 2021-2023. In 2022 Missouri Governor Mike parsons appointed Andrews as the Director of the Division of employment security within the Missouri department of labor

Missouri House of Representatives

Committee assignments

Electoral history

References

1967 births
Living people
Politicians from St. Joseph, Missouri
Republican Party members of the Missouri House of Representatives
21st-century American politicians
People from Grant City, Missouri